Zalophotrema is a genus of flatworms belonging to the family Brachycladiidae.

The species of this genus are found in Northern America.

Species:

Zalophotrema curilensis 
Zalophotrema hepaticum 
Zalophotrema lubimowi

References

Platyhelminthes